Bertrand-François Mahé, comte de La Bourdonnais (11 February 169910 November 1753) was a French naval officer and colonial administrator, in the service of the French East India Company.

Biography
La Bourdonnais entered the service of the French East India Company as a lieutenant. In 1724, he was promoted to captain, and displayed such bravery in the capture of Mahé on the Malabar Coast that the name of the town was added to his own; although an alternative account suggests that the town adopted his name, rather than the other way around. For two years he was in the service of the Portuguese Viceroy, but in 1735 he returned to French service as governor of the Isle de France (now Mauritius) and the Île de Bourbon (Réunion). His first five years' administration of the islands was vigorous and successful. He significantly increased the enslaved African population in Isle de France (Mauritius) which grew from only 638 in 1735 by around 1,300 annually. Labourdonnais also brought 70 slaves for his own estate. 

In 1744 Labourdonnais assembled a squadron of 3,342 men, including 720 slaves, and led a military expedition from Isle de France to Madras in India. His victory increased the rivalry with Governor of Pondicherry, Joseph François Dupleix. Soon Labourdonnais was accused of receiving money from the British East India Company and in 1746 he was forced to return to France to face trial and was jailed at the Bastille for 3 years.  He was replaced by Pierre Félix Barthelemy David, the son of a director of the French East India Company.

Recognition and legacy
In 1742 his name was given to the main island (Mahé Island) of the Seychelles archipelago by French explorer Lazare Picault. In 1806 the French General Decaen founded and named the historic port village of Mahébourg in homage to Mahé de La Bourdonnais. Close to the village of Mapou, in Rivière du Rempart District, there is an estate named Domaine de Labourdonnais with its manor house known as Le Château de Labourdonnais, built in 1856, and now converted into a museum. A statue of La Bourdonnais was erected at Place D'Armes in Port Louis on 30 August 1859 during a ceremony. In Curepipe a school called Lycée La Bourdonnais was founded in 1953, where the curriculum is modelled on practices in France. There is another statue of La Bourdonnais in the port of Saint-Malo, France. In Saint-Denis, Réunion a statue of La Bourdonnais was also erected, and a suburb is named Cité Labourdonnais. However the statue and suburb in Reunion island have been the target of anti-slavery protesters since 2020.

Family
In March and April 1738 two of Labourdonnais' children died and in May 1738 his wife also died on Isle de France (Mauritius). His daughter Montlezun Pardiac continued to live on Isle de France (Mauritius) and received an annual pension of 3,000 Louis following a vote in the National Assembly in August 1798. His grandson was Louis-Charles Mahé de La Bourdonnais. In December 1827 a lead-lined coffin containing the remains of Labourdonnais' wife and child was discovered during repairs of a government building near the Jardin de la Compagnie.

References

Further reading

Autobiography
B.-F. Mahé de La Bourdonnais: Mémoires historiques de B.-F. Mahé de La Bourdonnais, gouverneur des îles de France et de la Réunion, recueillis et publiés par son petit-fils... (Cte A.-C. Mahé de La Bourdonnais).   Paris, 1890  (with a second edition (Paris,1898))

Biography
Histoire, ou éloge historique de M. Mahé de La Bourdonnais.  [n. p.: n. d.] 
Île Maurice: Mahé de La Bourdonnais: documents réunis par le comité du bi-centenaire de La Bourdonnais, 11 février 1899, avec des annotations par le comité des souvenirs historiques. (2 août 1899).   Port-Louis : E. Pezzani, 1899
Étienne Buisson: Le mirage de l'Inde: la dramatique existence d'un grand Français au XVIIIe siècle : Bertrand Mahé de La Bourdonnais.   Paris : Hachette, 1937.
Pierre Crépin: Mahé de La Bourdonnais, gouverneur général des îles de France et de Bourbon (1699–1753) ... .    Paris : Leroux, n. d.
Louis Ducrocq: Une ingratitude nationale: La Bourdonnais, gouverneur des îles de France et de Bourbon, 1735–1746.   Arras : Sueur-Charruey, 1902  (Reprinted from the Revue de Lille of August 1902)
Philippe Haudrère: La Bourdonnais: marin et aventurier.   Paris : Desjonquères, 1992   
E. Herpin: Mahé de La Bourdonnais et la Compagnie des Indes.   Saint-Brieuc : R. Prud'homme, 1905
Alfred de Longpérier-Grimoard: Notice historique sur La Bourdonnais.     Paris, 1856
Huguette Ly Tio Fane-Pineo: Île de France, 1715–1746. Tome I. L'émergence de Port Louis .   Moka (Île Maurice) : Mahatma Gandhi Institute, 1993   
Michel Missoffe: Dupleix et La Bourdonnais: essai critique.    Paris : Ligue maritime et coloniale, 1943
Dureau Reydellet: Mahé de La Bourdonnais, gouverneur des Mascareignes.   Saint-Denis: Éd. CNH, 1994  (Cahiers de notre histoire ; 45–46)   
Louis Roubaud: La Bourdonnais.   Publication :  Paris : Plon, 1932    (Les grandes figures coloniales ; 10)
Jackie Ryckebusch: Bertrand-François Mahé de La Bourdonnais : entre les Indes et les Mascareignes.    Sainte-Clotilde : Éd. du CRI, 1989  (Collection: Figures)   
Robert Surcouf: Souvenirs historiques sur Mahé de La Bourdonnais: le combat de La Hogue. Eloge de La Tour d'Auvergne. Portzmoguer (Primauguet).   Saint-Malo, 1886
 Le Guide de Pondichéry. L'unique guide français de Pondichéry. Editions Presse Bureau 2008/2009. Pondicherry.
 Pondicherry Heritage Trail. Published by INTACH, Pondicherry. December 2007.

External links

French slave owners
Governors of Réunion
Governors of Isle de France (Mauritius)
French Navy officers from Saint-Malo
1699 births
1753 deaths
Prisoners of the Bastille